The Great Geauga County Fair is Ohio's oldest continuous county fair and home to one of the oldest existing agricultural societies in America. It is held annually in Burton, Ohio every Labor Day weekend as a "grand finale" to the summer. It has been around for almost 190 years, and each year nearly a quarter of a million people of all ages come to enjoy the more than 12,000 exhibits, animals, rides, food, music, entertainment and special attractions which are featured, as billed in the Fair's motto "Something for Everyone Since 1823".

History 
The Geauga County Agricultural and Manufacturing Society was formed in February 1823 to "promote Agriculture & Domestic Manufactures" and held the first annual fair on the square in Chardon, Ohio on October 23. The early fairs were alternately held in Burton and Chardon, with at least one fair held in Painesville, Ohio prior to the separation of Lake County from Geauga County in 1840. It has been held exclusively in Burton since the permanent establishment of the official county fairgrounds in the mid-1800s. 

Many of the buildings on the grounds used today date back to the nineteenth century, such as:
Domestic Arts Hall (built 1856, rebuilt 1889), a National Register of Historic Places property since 1979
Flower Hall (built 1890), a National Register of Historic Places property since 1979
Small Grandstand replica (original circa 1892, rebuilt 1997)
Section of the C & E Interurban railway station, now the Fair Administration building

Hugo Zacchini performed a human cannonball act at the fair in 1972.  WEWS-TV recorded and aired the entire act against his wishes and without compensating him, as was required by Ohio law. In Zacchini v. Scripps-Howard Broadcasting Co., the U.S. Supreme Court ruled that the First Amendment did not shield the broadcaster from liability from common law copyright claims.

The fair went on hiatus in 1917-18, 1942-44 and 2020.

Events 
There are over 300 vendors and concessionaries providing delicious fair food and amazing products and services. Enjoy live music, shows and demonstrations daily. In 2017, there will be magic shows, pig races and The Flying Pages Aerial Thrill Show - over 65 events. Main Grandstand Events include: Demolition derby, Tractor and Truck Pull, Broken Horn Rodeo, Horse Pulling, Harness Racing and the Band-O-Rama where local bands and cheerleaders perform. View the Daily Schedule at 

Demolition derby is a motor sport that is held at most fairs around the world. The races include up to five drivers that dodge their vehicles into one another and the last vehicle that is left is declared the winner.

Truck and Tractor Pull consists of street licensed 4x4 trucks weighing up to 8,000 pounds pulling item that are up to 10,000 or more pounds 

Attendees must purchase tickets to see the Demolition Derby, Truck Pull and Rodeo - available online at

Foundation Board 

The Foundation Board includes:

 Paul E. Harris, Chairman
 Doug Logan, Vice Chair
 Dianne Kellogg, Secretary/Treasurer
 Robert L. Phillips
 Keith E. Chapman
 Beverly D. McClelland
 James F. Patterson
 John Rowland
 Robin L. Stanley
 Sam Plants
 Vicki Koller

Fair officers and officials 
Each year there is an election held for new fair officers. There is also a board of twenty-one elected fair directors. Each fair director is elected from different townships with each holding a term for up to three years. The elected fair officials for the year of 2014 are as follows;

  President - Sam Plants
 Vice President - David Parker
 Secretary - Paul Harris
 Treasurer - Cheri Measures

References 

www.cleveland.about.com
Board of Agriculture of the State of Ohio
Ohio's Fairs: Counties Contests for the Biggest and Best

External links 
Great Geauga County Fair
Burton Village
Geauga County Government's website
Geauga County Tourism

Fairs in the United States
Fairgrounds in Ohio
Tourist attractions in Geauga County, Ohio